The 2021–22 Gibraltar Intermediate League is the fourth season of under-23 football in Gibraltar, after reforms to reserve team football in June 2018. The league will be contested by 12 teams - the eleven under-23 sides of the Gibraltar National League clubs plus Hound Dogs, and is set to begin on 18 October 2021. There are no reigning champions due to the previous season's abandonment.

Format
The Gibraltar Intermediate League was established by the Gibraltar Football Association in June 2018 as a merger of the pre-existing Reserves Division and Under 18 Division, in order to aid player development on the territory. Competing clubs are required to register a reserve squad of 18 players, of which 13 must be Gibraltarian.

Teams

Manchester 62 returned to the league after a one year absence, while Europa Point make their debut at U23 level, meaning that all 11 Gibraltar National League sides entered the Intermediate League for the first time. Due to the lack of resources necessary to compete in the new Gibraltar National League, Hound Dogs were granted special permission by the Gibraltar FA to participate as a senior side in the Intermediate League.

Note: Flags indicate national team as has been defined under FIFA eligibility rules. Players may hold more than one non-FIFA nationality.

League table

Season statistics

Scoring

Top scorers

1 Includes 1 goal for Bruno's Magpies Intermediate.

Clean Sheets

See also
2021–22 Gibraltar National League
2021–22 Gibraltar Women's Football League

References

Intermediate